was a town located in Yame District, Fukuoka Prefecture, Japan.

As of 2003, the town had an estimated population of 12,020 and a density of 138.73 persons per km². The total area was 86.64 km².

On February 1, 2010, Tachibana, along with the town of Kurogi, and the villages of Hoshino and Yabe (all from Yame District), was merged into the expanded city of Yame.

External links
 Yame official website 

Dissolved municipalities of Fukuoka Prefecture
Populated places disestablished in 2010